British rapper Stormzy has released three studio albums, one mixtape, two extended plays and twenty-one singles as a lead artist. His debut studio album, Gang Signs & Prayer, was released in February 2017 and peaked at number one on the UK Albums Chart. It spawned four top 40 singles, most notably "Big for Your Boots", which peaked at number six on the UK Singles Chart. His second studio album, Heavy Is the Head, was released in December 2019 and peaked at number one on the UK Albums Chart. It spawned four top 40 singles, most notably "Vossi Bop", which peaked at number one on the UK Singles Chart, making it his first number one single in the UK.

Studio albums

Mixtapes

Extended plays

Singles

As lead artist

As featured artist

Promotional singles

Other charted and certified songs

Guest appearances

Remixes

Notes

References

Discographies of British artists
Hip hop discographies